Talkback is the third studio album by Canadian new wave band Spoons, released in 1983 by Ready Records. The tracks that received airplay in Canada were "Old Emotions",
"The Rhythm" and "Talk Back". A music video was also produced for "Old Emotions", directed by Rob Quartly. This is the first Spoons album produced by Nile Rodgers.

The album was originally released only on vinyl and cassette, but this album was newly released on CD in Canada by Ready Records on 22 January 2010. The CD includes the Nile Rodgers produced singles "Tell No Lies" and "Romantic Traffic", which were recorded after the initial release of the Talkback album.

Track listing

Personnel
Credits are adapted from the Talkback liner notes.

Spoons
 Gordon Deppe — vocals; guitar
 Sandy Horne — bass; vocals
 Rob Preuss — electronic keyboards and piano
 Derrick Ross — drums

Production and artwork
 Nile Rodgers — producer
 Jason Corsaro — engineer
  Vic Pyle — assistant engineer at Sounds Interchange
 Bob Ludwig — mastering at Masterdisk, New York City
 Peter Noble — photography; cover concept
 Dale Heslip — design; cover concept
 Spoons — cover concept

References

External links
 

1983 albums
Spoons (band) albums
Albums produced by Nile Rodgers